Phasmolia is a monotypic genus of Papuan jumping spiders containing the single species, Phasmolia elegans. It was first described by J. X. Zhang & Wayne Paul Maddison in 2012, and is only found in Papua New Guinea.

References

Monotypic Salticidae genera
Salticidae